Amarildo Belisha (born 11 July 1981) is a retired Albanian footballer who played as a midfielder and defender. He spent the majority of his career with his boyhood club Vllaznia Shkodër, and represented the club in both the 2000 UEFA Intertoto Cup and the 2009–10 UEFA Europa League. He was given the nickname "Ildoja" during his time with Vllaznia Shkodër.

Club career
Following the end of the first part of 2009–10 Albanian Superliga, Belisha left Flamurtari Vlorë after making only 15 league appearances, becoming the club's 7th departure during the winter transfer window.

On 6 January 2010, during the winter transfer window, Belisha agreed terms with his first club Vllaznia Shkodër and returned for a fourth stint at the club. He signed a new one-year contract in July 2012.

On 10 November 2013, Belisha recorded his 300th appearance with Vllaznia Shkodër during the 1–0 away defeat to his former side Besa Kavajë, playing 81 minutes.

On 10 May 2014, he played his last match as a professional footballer during the 1–3 home defeat to Teuta Durrës, playing full-90 minutes. A day later, Belisha announced his retirement from professional football at the age of 33, ending thus his 15-year career. Following his retirement, Belisha told the media that he would start his coaching career.

International career
Belisha is the most-capped player in the history of Albania U21 with 16 appearances in all competitions.

Personal life
On 30 September 2015, Belisha was arrested along with the citizen Ridvan Llazani after they were caught while trading and transporting smuggled goods. They were arrested in Kukës – Shkodër highway.

Honours
Vllaznia Shkodër

Albanian Superliga: 2000–01
Albanian Supercup: 2001

Besa Kavajë

Albanian Cup: 2006–07

References

1981 births
Living people
Footballers from Shkodër
Albanian footballers
Albania under-21 international footballers
Association football defenders
KF Vllaznia Shkodër players
KF Elbasani players
Besa Kavajë players
Flamurtari Vlorë players
Kategoria Superiore players